This is a list of airports in the United Arab Emirates, sorted by location. Airports in bold have commercial service.

Airports

See also

 Transport in the United Arab Emirates
 List of airports by ICAO code: O#OM - United Arab Emirates
 Wikipedia: WikiProject Aviation/Airline destination lists: Asia#United Arab Emirates

References

United Arab Emirates
 
Airports
Airports
United Arab Emirates